The strategic plans of the Spanish Navy are based on the National Defence Directive (NDD) signed by the Prime Minister in June 2020. A subsequent Defence Policy Directive was then approved by the Minister of Defence. These serve to guide the Concept of Employment of the Armed Forces (CEFAS-21). The earlier 2003 Strategic Defence Review identified six capabilities as critical to the navy. These included: a "Projection Capability" and three subordinate capabilities (Protection, Freedom of Action and Operational Logistic Support). Additionally, the protection of national maritime interests at sea (sovereignty protection) and contributing to early warning were identified to round out the strategic planning framework. The core element has been the "Projection Capability" which was deemed to necessitate platforms that included: a command and control ship, amphibious shipping, an aircraft carrier, platforms with land-attack capabilities and a strategic projection ship.The protection and logistical support capabilities necessitate ships with surface-to-air,surface-to-surface and ASW capabilities while the logistic support capabilities require vessels capable of sustaining task forces on deployment.  

These strategic planning concepts have resulted in a series of procurement programs for the Spanish Navy.

Frigates

F-110 class (5 planned with multi-role capabilities to fulfill both power projection and protection tasks)
 F-111 (planned 2027)
 F-112 (planned 2028)
 F-113 (planned 2029)
 F-114 (planned 2030)
 F-115 (planned 2031)

In January 2023, it was announced that Spain would procure the Naval Strike Missile for the ship to carry out anti-ship and land-attack missions.

Submarines

 S-80 class (4 planned with air independent propulsion for fulfilling multiple tasks)(4 ordered)
 S-81  Isaac Peral (on sea trials, to commission 2023)
 S-82  Narciso Monturiol (under construction, planned 2024)
 S-83  Cosme García (under construction, planned 2026)
 S-84  Mateo García de los Reyes (under construction, planned 2028)

Patrol craft

 Based on the Meteoro class for sovereignty protection tasks, a platform is envisaged that will be more survivable and combat capable. Toward that end, Spain is a partner in the European Patrol Corvette program which envisages a vessel for delivery starting in the early 2030s.

Auxiliary ships

Search and Rescue ship
 Meteoro modified class (authorized for construction at a projected cost of 166 million Euros in 2021; she will begin construction in Spring 2023 and is planned for delivery in 2026)
Oceanographic Research ship
 Meteoro modified class (1 planned)

Naval Aviation
In October 2022, the General State Budget allocated EUR220 million (USD216 million) to start the process of replacing both the Air Force's F/A-18 Hornet and the Navy's AV-8B Harrier aircraft. A request for information has also been sent to the United States Government about both the F-35A and F-35B aircraft. Total projected budget of 6.25 billion Euros as of 2022.

In 2023, 900 million Euros were allocated to replace the Navy's SH-60B helicopters, likely with 8 MH-60R aircraft on an interim basis. In the longer-term, the acquisition of the NH-90 helicopter is planned as the Navy's principal multi-purpose helicopter.

Notes

 Future
Navy, Future
Spanish Navy